G. baccata may refer to:
 Galbulimima baccata, a paleodicot species in the genus Galbulimima
 Gaylussacia baccata, a huckleberry species
 Gibberella baccata, a fungal plant pathogen species

See also
 Baccata